Yuqiao is a Shanghai Metro interchange station in Pudong, Shanghai, located at the intersection of Yuqiao Road and Yuqing Road in Beicai town. It is served by Lines 11 and 18. The station opened as part of Line 11's phase 2 extension on August31, 2013. It became an interchange station with Line 18 when the southern portion of phase 1 of that line opened on 26 December 2020.

Station layout

References

Railway stations in Shanghai
Line 11, Shanghai Metro
Line 18, Shanghai Metro
Shanghai Metro stations in Pudong
Railway stations in China opened in 2013